YNR Productions (Young N Restless Productions) is a British independent record label that was founded as a collective of artists. It was established as a record label in 1999 with the release of Jehst's Premonitions EP.

Artists
Jehst
Jon Phonics
Jyager
Kashmere
Kingdom of Fear
Micall Parknsun
Sir Smurf Lil
Telemachus
Verb T
Lamplighter
Chemo
Asaviour
Tommy Evans
Usmaan

References

External links

British hip hop record labels
British independent record labels